High Pumping Station is a historic pumping station located in Jerome Park, Bronx, the Bronx, New York City. It was built between 1901 and 1906, and is a rectangular red brick building with a steeply pitched slate covered gable roof.  It was built as part of the Jerome Park Reservoir complex.

It was listed on the National Register of Historic Places in 1983.

The station is run by the New York City Department of Environmental Protection.

See also 
List of New York City Designated Landmarks in The Bronx
National Register of Historic Places in Bronx County, New York

References 

Buildings and structures in the Bronx
Water infrastructure of New York City
Water supply pumping stations on the National Register of Historic Places
Infrastructure completed in 1906
Romanesque Revival architecture in New York City
New York City Designated Landmarks in the Bronx
National Register of Historic Places in the Bronx
Jerome Park, Bronx
1906 establishments in New York City